Rutigliano is a surname. Notable people with the surname include: 

Danny Rutigliano, American actor
David Rutigliano (born 1965), American politician
Sam Rutigliano (born 1931), American football coach and analyst